Parliamentary elections were held in Niger on 21 October 1965 The country was a one-party state at the time, and voters were presented with a single list from the Nigerien Progressive Party – African Democratic Rally. According to official figures, 98.2% of eligible voters cast votes, and the PPN list won all 50 seats in the National Assembly.

Results

References

Niger
1965 in Niger
Elections in Niger
One-party elections